Rajya Sabha elections were held on various dates in 1975, to elect members of the Rajya Sabha, Indian Parliament's upper chamber.

Elections
Elections were held to elect members from various states.

Members elected
The following members are elected in the elections held in 1975. They are members for the term 1975-1981 and retire in year 1981, except in case of the resignation or death before the term.
The list is incomplete.

State - Member - Party

Bye-elections
The following bye elections were held in the year 1975.

State - Member - Party

 Jammu and Kashmir - Syyed Mir Qasim - JKNC ( ele  29/07/1975 term till 1978 ) res of D. P. Dhar
 Bihar - Hussain Zawar - JKNC ( ele  20/12/1975 term till 1978 )

References

1975 elections in India
1975